This list of ships of the Second World War contains major military vessels of the war, arranged alphabetically and by type. The list includes armed vessels that served during the war and in the immediate aftermath, inclusive of localized ongoing combat operations, garrison surrenders, post-surrender occupation, colony re-occupation, troop and prisoner repatriation, to the end of 1945. For smaller vessels, see also list of World War II ships of less than 1000 tons. Some uncompleted Axis ships are included, out of historic interest. Ships are designated to the country under which they operated for the longest period of the Second World War, regardless of where they were built or previous service history.

Naval warfare changed dramatically during the war, with the ascent of the aircraft carrier, and the impact of increasingly capable submarines. Destroyers saw dramatic improvements, as the  set a new standard not only for Japanese vessels, but for navies around the world, and are considered to be the world's first modern destroyer. Submarines were critical in the Pacific and Atlantic theatres. Advances in submarine technology included the snorkel, though advanced German submarine types came into service too late to impact the war effort.  The German Kriegsmarine also introduced the pocket battleship, to get around constraints imposed by the Treaty of Versailles.

Naval innovations included the use of diesel engines, and welded rather than riveted hulls. But the most important naval advances were in the field of anti-submarine warfare. Driven by the desperate necessity of keeping Britain and Japan supplied by sea, technologies for the detection and destruction of submarines were a high priority. While Japanese efforts proved futile, the Allied use of ASDIC (SONAR) became widespread as did the installation of shipboard and airborne radar.  The construction and launch of new ships during the war was limited due to protracted development and production timelines, but important developments were often retrofitted to older vessels.

See also

References

Bibliography

External links 

Ships
List A